Grenville is a village in Union County, New Mexico, United States. The population was 38 at the 2010 census. The village lost population for much of the twentieth century, but recent economic success bodes well.

Geography
Grenville is located at  (36.593305, -103.614552).

Demographics

As of the census of 2000, there were 25 people, 9 households, and 6 families residing in the village. The population density was 39.8 people per square mile (15.3/km2). There were 14 housing units at an average density of 22.3 per square mile (8.6/km2). The racial makeup of the village was 100.00% White.

There were 9 households, out of which 33.3% had children under the age of 18 living with them, 66.7% were married couples living together, and 33.3% were non-families. 33.3% of all households were made up of individuals, and 33.3% had someone living alone who was 65 years of age or older. The average household size was 2.78 and the average family size was 3.67.

In the village, the population was spread out, with 32.0% under the age of 18, 4.0% from 18 to 24, 20.0% from 25 to 44, 16.0% from 45 to 64, and 28.0% who were 65 years of age or older. The median age was 40 years. For every 100 females, there were 108.3 males. For every 100 females age 18 and over, there were 70.0 males.

The median income for a household in the village was $54,375, and the median income for a family was $58,125. Males had a median income of $0 versus $0 for females. The per capita income for the village was $21,536. None of the population and none of the families were below the poverty line.

In Popular Culture
Grenville appears in the "Book of World Records" sketch on the February, 11, 1995 episode of Saturday Night Live as the home of Craig Sorenson, author of a book of purported world records verifiable only by himself and his friends.  The village itself holds several of the records, including the record for being the "Second Best Place on Earth" (after Cancun, Mexico), and the place where the most bats were seen in a single night (1).

References

Villages in Union County, New Mexico
Villages in New Mexico